The Nelson Round Barn is a historic building located near Allerton in rural Wayne County, Iowa, United States.  It was built in 1912, and it was originally used as a dairy barn. The building is a true round barn that measures  in diameter. It features white vertical siding, an aerator, and a conical roof. The barn has been listed on the National Register of Historic Places since 1986.

References

Infrastructure completed in 1912
Buildings and structures in Wayne County, Iowa
Barns on the National Register of Historic Places in Iowa
Round barns in Iowa
National Register of Historic Places in Wayne County, Iowa
1912 establishments in Iowa